Tiare Rose Jennings (born June 5, 2002) is an American college softball player for the Oklahoma Sooners. As a freshman in 2021, she was named NFCA National Freshman of the Year, Softball America Freshman of the Year and was selected as a first-team All-American.

Early life
Tiare Rose Jennings was born to Maria and Ignacio Jennings in Torrance, California and grew up in San Pedro. She is of Samoan, Filipino and Mexican descent. Jennings played travel ball for the OC Batbusters, and won the 2019 USA Elite Select World Fastpitch Championship.

High school career
Jennings attended St. Anthony High School in Long Beach, California. During her freshman year, she was named the 2017 Southern Section Division 6 Player of the Year. She battled injuries during her junior year. During her senior year, she batted .710 with six home runs and 19 run batted in (RBIs), 18 runs scored, and a 1.483 slugging percentage in a season that was shortened due to the COVID-19 pandemic. She was named the 2019–20 Gatorade California Softball Player of the Year. She finished her high school career batting .581, with 111 hits, 61 RBIs and 16 home runs. She was ranked as the nations No. 2 recruit in the Class of 2020 by Extra Inning Softball's Elite 100 list and No. 4 on FloSoftball's Hot 100.

College career
Jennings made her collegiate debut for Oklahoma on February 11, 2021, in a game against UTEP. Jennings began her career going 4-for-4 with three home runs and six RBI in a 29–0 victory. Jennings and Grace Lyons each homered three times against the Miners, tying a school record for most home runs by an individual player in a game. The Sooners set an NCAA single-game record for home runs in a game with 13. During the weekend at the Miner Invitational, she was 12-for-13, with five home runs, 12 RBIs, 30 total bases, eight extra-base hits, and a .983 batting average. She was subsequently named Big 12 Player of the Week for the week ending February 16, 2021.

During the Courtyard Marriott Tournament, Jennings went 11-for-17, with a .647 batting average, four home runs, 10 RBIs and 23 total bases. Additionally, she did not register a strikeout all weekend and was perfect in the field, making appearances at second base, shortstop and third base, collecting seven assists and a pair of putouts. She was named Big 12 Player of the Week for the week ending March 9, earning her second weekly honor. Jennings earned her third player of the week honor for the week ending April 7. She went 6-for-9, with six RBIs, 11 total bases, and her 16th home run of the season, in a series against Kansas. Jennings earned her fourth player of the week honor for the week ending April 20. Jennings went 4-for-7, with three home runs, 13 total bases and five runs scored during a series against Texas.

During the regular season, she ranked first in the Big 12 Conference in runs scored (60) and RBIs (72), and tied for first in doubles (14), and ranked second in hits (66), home runs and slugging percentage. She finished the 2021 season with 27 home runs and led the nation with 92 RBI. She also ranked in the top five nationally in slugging percentage, home runs, doubles, hits and batting average. Jennings' 92 RBI broke the NCAA Division I freshman single-season RBI record. Following an outstanding season, she was named first-team All Big 12, Big 12 all-freshman team, Big 12 Freshman of the Year, NFCA National Freshman of the Year and Softball America Freshman of the Year. She was also one of only two freshmen in the country named a top 10 finalist for the USA Softball Collegiate Player of the Year.

During her sophomore year in 2022, she batted .385 with 24 home runs, 72 RBIs, and a .882 slugging percentage. Her 24 home runs ranked for fourth in the nation, while her 72 RBIs tied for third in the NCAA. In the field, she had a .982 fielding percentage, with 14 double plays, 46 putouts and 63 assists to two errors. Following the season she was named a unanimous first-team All-American.

References 

Living people
2002 births
American people of Samoan descent
Oklahoma Sooners softball players
People from San Pedro, Los Angeles
Softball players from California